A rasta is a white ceremonial garment that Mandaeans wear during most baptismal rites, religious ceremonies, and during periods of uncleanliness. It signifies the purity of the World of Light. The rasta is worn equally by the laypersons and the priests. If a Mandaean dies in clothes other than a rasta, it is believed that they will not reenter the "World of Light", unless the rite "Ahaba d-Mania" ('Giving of Garments') can be performed "for those who have died not wearing the ritual garment."

A rasta also has a stitched-on pocket called the daša.

Symbolism
The rasta is expected to be transmuted after death into a "garment of glory" for the soul ("the Perfecter of Souls ... will come out toward you and clothe your soul in a garment of radiance") – this is equivalent to the perispirit. 

A Mandaic hymn states:
 
"I became a garment to the worlds of Light ...
As for the chosen righteous, who put me on (as a garment),
their eyes were filled with Light."

Related clothing
Other ritual clothing pieces that typically go along with the rasta when worn by men, especially priests, are:

Burzinqa (turban)
Pandama (cloth wrapped around the mouth and lower face)

Special prayers in the Qolasta are also recited when putting on the burzinqa and pandama.

See also
Baptismal clothing
Burzinqa
Pandama
Drabsha
Mandaean cosmology
Masbuta
Masiqta
Parwanaya

Notes

Mandaean clothing
Mandaic words and phrases